is a Japanese sport shooter who competed in the 1964 Summer Olympics.

References

1937 births
Living people
Japanese male sport shooters
Trap and double trap shooters
Olympic shooters of Japan
Shooters at the 1964 Summer Olympics